Indigo De Souza is an American singer-songwriter from Asheville, North Carolina. Her most recent album, Any Shape You Take, was released in August 2021. She has been noted for creating "intimate, anxious indie rock songs [that] wrangle with disappointment and relationship challenges," with personal and confessional lyrics.

Career
De Souza grew up in the conservative small town of Spruce Pine, North Carolina, where she and her artist mother faced difficulty fitting in. De Souza's father is a Brazilian guitarist who was absent during much of her childhood. Her family moved to Asheville during her teen years.

With encouragement from her mother, De Souza started making music at age 9, and began self-producing her own recordings in 2016. Her first release was an EP titled Boys that was recorded in a friend's garage, followed by another EP titled Don't Cry Just Do in 2017. She self-released her first full-length album, I Love My Mom, in June 2018. Saddle Creek Records discovered the album and gave it a proper release in 2021. The album gained notice from journalists for De Souza's lyrics on taboo topics.

De Souza co-produced her second album, Any Shape You Take, with Brad Cook, who has also produced for Bon Iver and Waxahatchee. The album was released in August 2021, and was noted for De Souza's emotional singing and her mastery of several different musical styles. De Souza toured with a full band featuring Dexter Webb (guitar), Zack Kardon (bass), and Avery Sullivan (drums). She also formed a neo soul side project called Icky Bricketts with Ethan Baechtold.

In February 2023, De Souza announced via social media that her next album All of This Will End would release in April of that year. The announcement was paired with the release of a single called "Younger & Dumber" that same day.

Discography

Studio albums

Extended plays

Singles

External links
 Photography: Indigo De Souza and Horse Jumper of Love at Music Hall of Williamsburg in April 2022, The Alternative 25 April 2022

References

Living people
American women guitarists
American women singer-songwriters
Guitarists from North Carolina
Singer-songwriters from North Carolina
21st-century American women
American people of Brazilian descent
Saddle Creek Records artists
1997 births